The James Buchanan Walker House, in Centerville, Tennessee, was built in 1903.  It was listed on the National Register of Historic Places in 1989.

It is Classical Revival in style, designed by Clarence K. Coley.  It has a "portico with
tall round reeded columns topped by Scamozzi capitals."

References

National Register of Historic Places in Hickman County, Tennessee
Neoclassical architecture in Tennessee
Houses completed in 1903